Mario Laguë (1958 – August 12, 2010) was a Canadian diplomat and public servant. He served as ambassador to Costa Rica, Honduras and Nicaragua, and at the time of his death, he was the communications director for the Liberal Party of Canada.

Career
Laguë spent the early years of his career in Quebec politics, working closely with the Quebec Liberal party.  In the 1990s, he joined the Privy Council Office in Intergovernmental Affairs to specifically work on the unity file.  He was named Assistant Secretary to the Cabinet (Communications) in 1999, which is the most senior communications position in government.  In 2003, he was named incoming Prime Minister Paul Martin's Director of Communications, a post he held until 2005, when he was named by Martin as the Ambassador to Costa Rica, with concurrent accreditation to Honduras and Nicaraguawa.

Following his diplomatic appointment, he joined the International Union for Conservation of Nature near Geneva, before returning to Ottawa in 2009 to take the job of Director of Communications to Liberal Leader Michael Ignatieff.

Death
Laguë was killed on the morning of August 12, 2010, when his motorcycle crashed into an SUV, in Ottawa, Ontario, Canada, as he was on his way to work. He died at the age of 52 leaving behind his wife, novelist Caroline Vu, and two children.

References

1958 births
2010 deaths
Liberal Party of Canada
Road incident deaths in Canada
Accidental deaths in Ontario
Motorcycle road incident deaths
Ambassadors of Canada to Costa Rica
Ambassadors of Canada to Honduras
Ambassadors of Canada to Nicaragua
Communications directors of the Canadian Prime Minister's Office